The Cleveland Clinic Journal of Medicine is a peer-reviewed medical journal published by the Cleveland Clinic. It covers internal medicine, endocrinology, and diabetes. The editor-in-chief is Brian Mandell.

The journals is indexed in the Journal Citation Reports.

Mission
According to the journal, their mission is "to provide its readers with up-to-date, practical, clinical information relevant to internal medicine, cardiology, and related fields."  To achieve that goal, their content "has a continuing-education orientation rather than (a focus) on original research or case reports."

References

External links
Cleveland Clinic Journal of Medicine

General medical journals
Cleveland Clinic